William McLeod Wilson  is a former judge of the Court of Appeal and Supreme Court of New Zealand. In 2010, he became the first New Zealand judge to resign after being accused of judicial misconduct. Wilson was subjected to the first report by the Judicial Conduct Commissioner, which recommended a Judicial Conduct Panel be formed. This report of the Commissioner was prematurely released to the press and subsequent media attention forced Wilson's resignation from the Supreme Court.

Career history
Wilson attended Victoria University of Wellington, where he earned LLB and LLM degrees. He worked with law firm Bell Gully and became a partner of the firm in 1971. He was a member of the Waitangi Tribunal from 1986 to 1995 and became a Queen's Counsel in 1996.

Wilson was appointed as a judge on the Court of Appeal of New Zealand in early 2007.

After serving less than a year on the Court of Appeal, Wilson was appointed to the Supreme Court of New Zealand in December 2007 to replace the retiring Sir Kenneth Keith.

Misconduct allegation and resignation
In 2010, three complaints were made to the Judicial Conduct Commissioner Sir David Gascoigne. It was alleged that Wilson had sat as a member of the Court of Appeal in which Alan Galbraith QC was representing one of the parties. The complaints alleged that Wilson had failed to disclose the extent to which he could be seen as beholden to Galbraith. The complaints stated that while Galbraith and Wilson both equally owned an equestrian business, Galbraith had put in approximately $200,000 more into the business than Wilson had. Galbraith was also a contractual guarantor on a loan Wilson had received from the bank. Wilson opposed the view that there was a logical connection behind these arrangements and a conflict of interest; however the legal threshold for recusal is "the appearance of bias", not bias itself.

On the basis of the complaints, a preliminary investigation by the Judicial Conduct Commissioner recommended that Attorney-General Chris Finlayson establish a Judicial Conduct Panel. The Judicial Conduct Commissioner publicly released the content of his recommendation before a Judicial Conduct Panel was appointed to investigate, effectively ending Wilson's ability to continue as a judge. The Judicial Conduct Commissioner's findings were subject to a successful judicial review by Wilson in the full High Court, which found the Judicial Conduct Commissioner had made several errors in law. The Court was also troubled that Wilson had been subject to the release of the report, which is envisaged to be confidential. The Court noted that Wilson had been the subject of "inaccurate publicity, apparently designed to hound him from office".

Wilson announced in October 2010 that he would resign from the Supreme Court, effective 5 November. The Ministry of Justice gave him one year's salary and per the JCC and JCP Act, his legal fees were paid for. It was reported that the government had rejected an earlier offer of Wilson to resign because the terms were unacceptable to the government. Wilson was the first New Zealand judge to resign after an accusal of judicial misconduct. 

Wilson did not keep his title The Honourable after resigning from the bench. 

Lawyer  Sue Grey from the original case who had originally argued Wilson had a conflict of interest, was fired from her job at Department of Conservation over her role in the case.

Notes

Court of Appeal of New Zealand judges
New Zealand King's Counsel
Supreme Court of New Zealand judges
Victoria University of Wellington alumni
Living people
Members of the Waitangi Tribunal
Year of birth missing (living people)